Indonesian people in the United Kingdom include British citizens and non-citizen immigrants and expatriates of Indonesian descent in the United Kingdom.

Demographics

Population
The 2001 Census recorded 6,711 Indonesian-born people residing in the UK. According to the 2011 UK Census, there were 8,659 Indonesian-born residents in England, 212 in Wales, 679 in Scotland, and 74 in Northern Ireland.

Notable people
Notable Indonesians in the United Kingdom include:
Elkan Baggott

References

Asian diaspora in the United Kingdom
United Kingdom
Immigration to the United Kingdom by country of origin